Harold Gade (February 12, 1899 – November 18, 1985) was a member of the Wisconsin State Assembly.

Biography
Gade was born on February 12, 1899, in Denmark. He later moved to Racine, Wisconsin.

Career
Gade was elected to the Assembly in 1948. Previously, he was a Racine alderman from 1945 to 1947. He was a Democrat. In 1952, he was sentenced to Waupun State Prison for embezzling nearly $37,000.

References

Danish emigrants to the United States
Politicians from Racine, Wisconsin
Wisconsin city council members
1899 births
1985 deaths
20th-century American politicians
Democratic Party members of the Wisconsin State Assembly